TRFC may refer to:

In association football (soccer):
Tampines Rovers FC
Threave Rovers F.C.
Tobermore United F.C.
Tolka Rovers F.C.
Tranmere Rovers F.C.

In rugby union:
Taunton R.F.C.
Teignmouth R.F.C.
Thurrock Rugby Football Club
Tynedale R.F.C.
Thetford Rugby Union Football Club